A resistance gene is any gene producing resistance against an agent. This gene may produce:
 Drug resistance
 Antimicrobial resistance
 Multiple drug resistance
 
 
 Gene-for-gene relationship
 Tolerance to infections
 
 
 
 
 
 
 
 
 
 
 
 
 Resistance to herbivores - plant defense against herbivory

See also
 Resistance mutation (disambiguation)

Genes by type
Drug-sensitivity genes
Mutated genes
Ecological genetics
Evolutionary ecology